Birge Schade (born 7 February 1965) is a German film actress. She appeared in more than ninety films since 1989.

Selected filmography

References

External links

 

1965 births
Living people
German film actresses
German television actresses